Ratsiraka is a Malagasy surname. You may be looking for:

Céline Ratsiraka, Malagasy politician, wife of Didier
Didier Ratsiraka (1936–2021), President of Madagascar 1975–1993 and 1997–2002
Roland Ratsiraka  (born 1966), Malagasy politician, nephew of Didier